The Long Shadow  is a 1932 mystery detective novel by Anthony Gilbert, the pen name of British writer Lucy Beatrice Malleson.  It is the seventh of ten novels in a series featuring her amateur detective and politician Scott Egerton, a precursor to her better known creation Arthur Crook.

Synopsis
Mademoiselle Robert had twenty five years earlier been a celebrated star on the Parisian stage before drifting in anonymity. Now she has been founded dead in a slum-like tenement in London, with a knife through her heart.

References

Bibliography
 Magill, Frank Northen . Critical Survey of Mystery and Detective Fiction: Authors, Volume 2. Salem Press, 1988.
 Murphy, Bruce F. The Encyclopedia of Murder and Mystery. Springer, 1999.
 Reilly, John M. Twentieth Century Crime & Mystery Writers. Springer, 2015.

1932 British novels
British mystery novels
British thriller novels
Novels by Anthony Gilbert
Novels set in London
British detective novels
Collins Crime Club books